The IBM 4020 Military Computer was a Cold War era military computer. Two of them were used in the two IBM AN/FSQ-31 SAC Data Processing Systems.

Details:
 Instruction rate : Up to 400,000 instructions per second
 Cycle time : 2.5 microseconds
 Word size : 48 bits + 2 parity bits
 Core storage : up to 131,072 words
 operates in parallel mode
 69 instructions
 single address instructions
 Add or subtract : 2.5 microseconds (fixed point)
 Add or subtract :  (floating point)
 Multiply : average 24 µs (24 bit precision fixed point)
 Multiply :  (floating point)
 Multiprocessing with Automatic Priority

The instruction format includes:
 7 bit op code
 2 bit real data indicator
 3 bit byte displacement 
 3 bit mode selector
 1 sign bit
 8 bit 'byte activity'
 1 bit Double index flag
 1 bit Indirect address flag
 4 bit index register selection
 18 bit address.

Man-machine communications included a light-gun to indicate an area of interest on a visual display unit.

Circuit logic packaging was based on 7 types of Q-pacs each holding 1 to 4 circuits. Transistors and semiconductor diodes were soldered to the outside of the Q-pac encapsulation for ease of cooling and replacement.

References

IBM transistorized computers
Military electronics of the United States
48-bit computers